Ross Barbour may refer to:

Ross Barbour (footballer) (born 1993), Scottish footballer
Ross Barbour (singer) (1928–2011), American singer with The Four Freshmen
Rossy Barbour (1901–1993), Canadian politician